Baba Jan may refer to:

People
 Baba Jan (politician), a political activist from the Gilgit-Baltistan administrative territory of Pakistan

Places
 Baba Jan, East Azerbaijan
 Babajan, Lorestan
 Baba Jan-e Palizi, Kermanshah Province

See also
 Babajan (disambiguation)